Harold A. Fisher (February 6, 1882December 29, 1967) was an American college basketball coach from New York City, New York.

In 1905, while a student and player at Columbia University, Fisher began coaching the basketball team of Fordham University, leading the team to a 4–2 record while capturing All-American honors as a player and leading Columbia to its second straight national championship.

In 1906, Fisher assumed the head coaching duties at Columbia, where he would remain for ten years, during which times his teams amassed a record of 101–39 and won three Eastern Intercollegiate Basketball League titles; in 1909 and 1910, Fisher simultaneously coached Columbia and St. John's University, helping the latter to a 15–5 record during his tenure.

In recognition of his work at Columbia, Fisher was commissioned by General Douglas MacArthur to coach the basketball team at United States Military Academy after World War I. He assumed the job in 1921 and coached three seasons at the school, leaving with a record of 46–5. His 1922–23 team finished the season with a 17–0 record and was retroactively named the national champion by the Premo-Porretta Power Poll.

For his work in developing the game of basketball, first as a member of a four-person committee that wrote the first rules for collegiate basketball and the editor of the resulting "Collegiate Rules Committee and Collegiate Guide" (1905–1915), and later as athletic director at Columbia (1911–1917), Fisher was inducted as a contributor into the Basketball Hall of Fame in 1974.

References

External links
 Naismith Memorial Basketball Hall of Fame profile
 College Basketball Hall of Fame profile

1882 births
1967 deaths
All-American college men's basketball players
American men's basketball coaches
American men's basketball players
American military personnel of World War I
Army Black Knights men's basketball coaches
Basketball coaches from New York (state)
Basketball players from New York City
Columbia Lions athletic directors
Columbia Lions baseball coaches
Columbia Lions baseball players
Columbia Lions football coaches
Columbia Lions men's basketball coaches
Columbia Lions men's basketball players
Fordham Rams men's basketball coaches
Guards (basketball)
Naismith Memorial Basketball Hall of Fame inductees
National Collegiate Basketball Hall of Fame inductees
St. John's Red Storm men's basketball coaches